Hader Clinic is a private residential addiction and mental health treatment center based in Melbourne, Australia. In 2016, Hader Clinic was the subject of the ABC TV Four Corners episode Rehab Inc.: The high price parents pay to get their kids off ice. 

Primary residential programs are located in Geelong, Victoria, Bacchus Marsh, Victoria and Araluen, Queensland.

The Hader Clinic treatment model is a modified therapeutic community with additional therapeutic features, which desires to treat all aspects of addiction and the individual, including their physical, psychological, emotional, social and spiritual well-being. It also addresses the issues underlying the addiction.

References

External links
 Hader Clinic
 Hader Clinic Queensland

Mental health in Australia